Pomona is a village partly in the town of Ramapo and partly in the town of Haverstraw in Rockland County, New York, United States. It is located north of New Hempstead, east of Harriman State Park, north of Monsey and west of Mount Ivy. According to the 2020 Census, the population was 3,824, a

History
The village of Pomona was incorporated February 3, 1967, within the towns of Ramapo and Haverstraw. Actor Burgess Meredith provided the seed money for the incorporation. Pomona was named after the goddess of fruit trees, gardens, and orchards, for the area's many apple orchards.

Geography
Pomona is located at  (41.186504, -74.055417).

All of Pomona's total area is land.

Demographics

At the 2010 census there were 3,103 people, 1,011 households, and 863 families in the village. The population density was 1,292.92 people per square mile (492.54/km). There were 1,054 housing units at an average density of 439.17 per square mile (167.3/km). The racial makeup of the village was 66.0% white, 19.1% African American, 0.2% Native American, 9.3% Asian, 2.2% from other races, and 3.2% from two or more races. Hispanic or Latino of any race were 7.1%.

Of the 1,011 households, 32.7% had children under the age of 18 living with them, 75.6% were married couples living together, 6.6% had a female householder with no husband present, and 14.6% were non-families. 10.7% of households were one person and 3.6% were one person aged 65 or older. The average household size was 3.01 and the average family size was 3.22.

The age distribution was 24.2% age 19 and under, 4.4% from 20 to 24, 20.6% from 25 to 44, 35.0% from 45 to 64, and 15.9% 65 or older. The median age was 45.5 years. For every 100 females, there were 99.2 males. For every 100 females age 18 and over, there were 97.8 males.

The median household income was $103,608 and the median family income  was $108,399. Males had a median income of $72,857 versus $48,958 for females. The per capita income for the village was $43,946. About 1.5% of families and 2.0% of the population were below the poverty line, including 1.1% of those under age 18 and 7.1% of those age 65 or over.

Government 
As of October 2022, the Mayor of Pomona is Ian Banks and the Trustees are Ilan Fuchs, Marc Greenberg, Mendy Lasker, and Carol Mcfarlane.

Historical markers
 Ladentown United Methodist Church, 14 Ladentown Road (NRHP). 
 The Pig Knoll School, 584 Route 306 - currently the Pomona Cultural Center.

Landmarks and places of interest
 Clover Stadium (formerly Provident Bank Park, formerly Palisades Credit Union Park)
 Pomona Cultural Center, 584 Route 306, Pomona NY 10970
 Seaman-Knapp House

Parks
 Burgess Meredith
 Secor 
 Van den Hende

Sports
 New York Boulders (formerly Rockland Boulders) - an independent professional baseball team. They are a member of the Frontier League.

References

External links
 

Villages in New York (state)
Villages in Rockland County, New York